Motu Ahuna is a  island in the Bora Bora Islands Group, within the Society Islands of French Polynesia. It is the located between Toopua, and Tevairoa.

The island is the site of the Villa Ahuna hotel.  Villa Ahuna is located on the Southern end of Motu Ahuna.

The nearest airport is Bora Bora Airport.

Administration
The island is part of Bora Bora Commune.
Its current population includes the family operating the hotel.

References